Pierre Tcherniakowski (29 January 1928 – 8 October 2016), better known as Pierre Tchernia, was a French cinema and television producer, screenwriter, presenter, animator and actor. In France he was known as "Magic" Tchernia and Monsieur Cinema.

Early life
Born in Paris as Pierre Tcherniakowski, he was the youngest of four children. His father, a Ukrainian immigrant, was an engineer and his mother a seamstress. He grew up in Courbevoie. In 1940, at age 12, he saw John Ford's Western Stagecoach and was inspired to work in cinema. After graduation, he enrolled in a film and photography technical school, and then joined the Institute for Advanced Cinematographic Studies.

Career 
He was part of the creation of the first televised news in France in 1949 and was an early French news presenter. In 1955 he became a producer of animation (with a heavy influence from the early animation of Walt Disney). For many years he hosted a television game show of movie trivia, Monsieur Cinéma . He was also host or presenter for various French talk, variety, quiz and music shows over the years such as La Clé des champs. Tchernia was the regular French commentator in the Eurovision Song Contest on 14 occasions from 1958 until 1974.

On 14 July 2011, he became Commandeur of the Legion of Honor.

Asterix 
A good friend of René Goscinny and Albert Uderzo, the creators of Asterix, he narrated many of the Asterix films in the original French, and wrote the screenplay for four of them.
He was also caricatured numerous times in the series:
 initially in Pilote 306 he is shown interviewing Asterix about the upcoming story Asterix in Britain
 in Asterix the Legionary he is pictured as one of the Roman officers around Caesar's map table
 in Pilote 556 the announcement page for Asterix in Switzerland has him hosting a game show with Asterix as guest and Goscinny & Uderzo as contestants
 in Asterix in Corsica he is "Centurion Hippopotamus" of the Roman camp of Totorum (same character is used in "Asterix Versus Caesar" animated movie)
 in Asterix and Caesar's Gift he appears as one of the soldiers being demobbed
 in Obelix and Co. he is part of the demoralized troop being replaced at the start of the story—drinking from an amphora of wine, he is seen being carried out by caricatures of Goscinny and Uderzo
 in Asterix in Belgium he is a legionary who has no problem with being beaten up by Obelix after having been stationed in Belgium
 in The Twelve Tasks of Asterix he is the Roman Prefect in a bureaucratic office known as "The Place That Sends You Mad."

His caricature can also be found in the Lucky Luke animated film La Ballade des Dalton (1978), where he is depicted on a picture on the wall, when Luke visits the character Thaddeus Collins.

Filmography (selected) 
 1949 part of the first French television news
 1961 L'Ami Public n°1 — host of a series on the films of Walt Disney
 1963 Carom Shots — screenwriter
 1965 Pleins feux sur Stanislas — actor
 1966 won the Rose d'Or (Golden Rose) at the Montreux festival
 1966 Monsieur Cinéma television quiz show (host)
 1968 Asterix and Cleopatra — screenwriter/film adaption
 1971 Daisy Town (Lucky Luke) — lyrics
 1976 The Twelve Tasks of Asterix — screenwriter/narrator in the original French
 1978 The Ballad of the Dalton Gang (Lucky Luke) — screenwriter
 1985 Asterix Versus Caesar — screenwriter
 1986 Asterix in Britain — screenwriter/film adaption
 2002 Asterix and Obelix: Mission Cleopatra — played "Caius Gaspachoandalus"/narrator in the original French
 2006 Asterix and the Vikings — narrator in the original French

References

External links 
 
 Mini Biography 
 Caricatures of Pierre Tchernia in many Astérix albums 

1928 births
2016 deaths
Male actors from Paris
French male film actors
French television personalities
French male screenwriters
France in the Eurovision Song Contest
French people of Ukrainian descent
Commandeurs of the Légion d'honneur
Asterix
French male stage actors
French male television actors